The Tennessee Emergency Management Agency (TEMA) is an agency of Tennessee government tasked with preparing for and responding to natural and man-made disasters across the state of Tennessee. The agency is headquartered in Nashville, Tennessee. TEMA is a component of the Tennessee Military Department, along with the Tennessee National Guard (Tennessee Army National Guard and Tennessee Air National Guard) and the Tennessee State Guard.

History
The Office of Civil Defense (OCD) was established in 1951 with the primary purpose of preparing civil defense plans in the event of nuclear weapons being detonated in Tennessee during a hypothetical war between the United States and the Soviet Union. This continued to be the main focus of the agency through the 1960s as the OCD prepared the Tennessee Plan for the Management of Resources, a plan designed to manage resources after a nuclear strike. In 1984, after the Waverly, Tennessee, tank car explosion, the Office of Civil Defense was renamed the Tennessee Emergency Management Agency and assigned its first civilian director.

Organizational structure

Executive Office
The Executive Office is composed of the Director of TEMA and his assistants, Chief of Staff / Assistant Director for Administration and Mission Support, Assistant Director for Preparedness, Assistant Director for Mitigation and Recovery, and Assistant Director for Operations and Field Services.

Executive Staff
The executive command staff is composed of several executive positions given the following roles and responsibilities:
Chief of Staff / Assistant Director for Administration and Mission Support: The Chief of Staff manages the financial oversight of the agency and approves expenses and all purchases and reimbursements by the agency.
Assistant Director for Preparedness
Assistant Director for Operations and Field Services
Assistant Director for Mitigation and Recovery
Executive Officer for External Relations and Partnerships: acts as the liaison between the Director's Office and the public, including the media.
Public Safety Liaison The PSL acts as a liaison from the Director's Office to law enforcement, fire services, emergency medical response, rescue, and dispatch organizations, as well as advising regional directors.
Executive Assistant to the Director: The AAD provides administrative support to the Director of TEMA and the Executive Team.

TEMA Divisions and Branches

PREPAREDNESS DIVISION
The division handles the planning and implementation of exercises and simulations designed to prepare first responders both inside and outside of the agency for emergency situations. The division also provides training on specific emergency management skills.

Planning and Analysis Branch

Training Section

Exercise Section

Technical Hazards Branch

OPERATIONS AND FIELD SERVICES DIVISION

State Watch Point 

The State Watch Point handles the coordination between different agencies during emergencies. The branch also ensures that communications are maintained during emergencies between first responders as well as the agency and the public.

MITIGATION AND RECOVERY DIVISION

Mitigation Branch

Recovery Branch

ADMINISTRATION AND MISSION SUPPORT DIVISION 

handles purchases and acquisitions for the agency, and supports day-to-day operations by maintaining the lands, vehicle fleet, information technology elements, and other equipment of the agency as well as managing the relationship between the agency and its volunteers and donors.

Human Resource Administration

Grants and Programs Branch
The Grants and Programs Branch oversees all grants which are awarded to the Tennessee Management Emergency Agency, as well as the federal grants and funds which are processed through TEMA to be allocated to victims of disasters.

Mission Support Branch

Logistics

Communications

References

External links
Tennessee Emergency Management Agency Official Website
Prior Tennessee Emergency Management Agency Website - Old URL

Emergency management in the United States
State agencies of Tennessee
1951 establishments in Tennessee